Lauta may refer to the following places in Saxony, Germany

 Lauta,  a town in the district of Bautzen
 Lauta (Marienberg), a village in the borough of Marienberg
 Verwaltungsgemeinschaft Lauta, a former Verwaltungsgemeinschaft
 Lauta, genus of sea snail.